Panthera onca augusta, commonly known as the Pleistocene jaguar or simply the giant jaguar, is an extinct subspecies of the jaguar that was endemic to North America during the Pleistocene epoch (1.8 mya–11,000 years ago).

History and distribution

Although P. onca still resides in the southern United States and several Native American tales possibly about P. onca augusta exist, the first published remains were described in 1872. The fossils were found by Ferdinand Vandeveer Hayden on the Platte River of Nebraska and sent to Joseph Leidy at the Academy of Natural Sciences in Philadelphia, who named them Felis augustus in 1872. The fossils consisted of a premolar IV and maxilla fragment, the type (USNM 1004), as well as another tooth and a distal humerus, though the humerus is likely that of Panthera atrox or Smilodon fatalis. Leidy also mistakenly believed the fossils were from the Pliocene, but they actually come from the Pleistocene. 

Later in 1919, Oliver Perry Hay described a left canine from Vero, Florida that he named Felis veronis, though it is now seen as a synonym of P. onca augusta. In 1929, George Simpson referred several teeth from Seminole Field, Florida to F. veronis and the same year a right mandible and several teeth from Melbourne, Florida were collected by Dr. J. W. Gidley. All material found has been referred to P. onca augusta, the mandible notably was the first complete one found of the taxon. Yet another discovery came in 1938, with the discovery of 2 fragmentary postcranial skeletons of P. onca augusta in Cumberland Cave, Maryland intermingled with that of a puma. 

The most productive discoveries outside of California came in 1939 and 1944, with the discoveries of footprints and several fossils in Craighead Caverns, Tennessee during the former year. 1944 saw the collection of 2, well preserved skeletons in Salt River Cave, also in Tennessee, that included 2 partial skulls and many axial elements that clearly demonstrated the subspecies’ clear differences with other taxa. Many more fossils were later collected by the American Museum of Natural History at Craighead Caverns, including several mandibles and partial craniums. 

Additional P. onca augusta fossils have been found in Oregon and most notably, the La Brea Tar Pits of California. P. onca augusta is most frequently found in Florida’s localities, as there are many fossil-bearing sites from the Pleistocene throughout Florida. In 2021, a partial mandible was referred to P. onca augusta from Chapala, Mexico, extending the range south to southwestern Mexico.

See also
 Pleistocene South American jaguar, P. onca mesembrina
 Panthera gombaszoegensis
 North American jaguar
 South American jaguar

References

External links

Jaguars
onca augusta
Pleistocene carnivorans
Pleistocene mammals of North America
Pleistocene mammals of South America
Prehistoric mammals of North America
Pleistocene first appearances
Pleistocene extinctions